Fort Worth Christian School is a private Christian preparatory school in North Richland Hills, Texas. Established in 1958, the school serves students in preschool through grade 12.

On February 27, 2010, the 43rd President of the United States George W. Bush spoke at the Annual FWC Cardinal Gala at the Omni Hotel in Fort Worth, Texas.

All high school and middle school students are given a personal ChromeBook. In the elementary school, students use iPads to assist in their learning.

History
Fort Worth Christian School first opened its doors in the fall of 1958, offering kindergarten through eighth grade and a junior college, then adding a grade every year, and finally adding a preschool. In 1972, the school phased out the junior college.

The school is accredited by the Southern Association of Colleges and Schools. The school is a member of the National Christian Schools Association, the Texas Association of Non-Public Schools, the Texas Christian Schools Association, the Texas Independent School Consortium, and the Texas Association of Private and Parochial Schools.

Campus
The school sits on more than 40 acres in the geographic center of North Richland Hills. Major facilities on campus include the Campus Center (Opened in 2003), Center for Science and Technology, Administration Building, The Cardinal Gym, The Mitchell Gym, Gene and Dorthy Barrow Field, and Inspiration Field (Baseball).

Curriculum
In addition to its college-prep curriculum, Fort Worth Christian offers Advanced Placement and dual enrollment courses. All grades have a Bible class included in each student's schedule, along with daily chapel provided by the faculty and staff. 100% of all graduates pursue higher education and earn up to $2,000,000 in scholarships.

Social Sciences, Language, Religion & The Arts
Fort Worth Christian offers Dual-Credit, AP, and Pre-AP classes in the social sciences, language, religion, and fine arts area. The Dual-Enrollment (Dual-Credit) classes enroll students in the class with Texas Wesleyan University and Tarrant County Community College, giving them college credit. Fort Worth Christian offers multiple language courses:
Latin I, Latin II, PAP Latin III & PAP Latin IV
Spanish I, Spanish II, PAP Spanish III, PAP Dual-Credit Spanish IV, PAP Spanish V
American Sign Language I, ASL II, ASL III, ASL IV

English courses include:
English I, PAP English I
English II, PAP English II
English III
PAP Dual-Credit Composition and Rhetoric
PAP Dual-Credit British Literature
AP English Literature and Composition
AP English Language and Composition
English IV

Social science courses credited include:
Ancient World History, PAP Ancient World History
Modern World History
AP World History
Psychology
AP Government
AP Macroeconomics
AP United States History

Biblical courses for credit include:
Life of Christ
Old Testament Survey
PAP Dual-Credit Ethics
PAP Dual-Credit New Testament
Theology
Home & Family

Fine Arts credits include:
Art I
Art II, PAP Art II
AP Art Portfolio
Band
Orchestra
Theatre Arts
Beginning Choir
Advanced Choir Ensemble
Each year, the school puts on two full-scale theatrical performances. Past musicals performed were "Happy Days" and "Annie Get Your Gun." In the recent years, several students have received Betty Lynn Buckley Awards for their performances.

Electives:
Film as Fiction, PAP Film as Fiction
Chapel Practicum

Math, Sciences & Technology
As previously mentioned, Fort Worth Christian offers Dual-Credit, AP, and Pre-AP classes in the math and science area. The Center for Science and Technology  has 3 fully equipped science labs and 2 fully equipped computer labs. Math courses offered for credit are:
Algebra I
Intermediate Algebra
Geometry, PAP Geometry
Algebra II, PAP Algebra II
Pre-Calculus, PAP Pre-Calculus
PAP Dual-Credit College Algebra
PAP Dual-Credit Single Variable Calculus (Calculus I)
AP Calculus BC (Calculus I & II)

Science courses offered for credit include:
Integrated Physics & Chemistry (Middle School)
Biology, PAP Biology, AP Biology
Chemistry, PAP Chemistry, AP Chemistry
PAP Anatomy and Physiology
Physics, PAP Physics, AP Physics B
Environmental Science, PAP Environmental Science

Technological courses include:
Technology Applications Survey
Networking
AP Computer Science
Robotics and Engineering
Yearbook
Newspaper

Extracurricular activities
Students also publish a yearbook, The Cardinal. Student government consists of Student Council officers and class representatives from each grade level. National Honor Society members are selected from the student body based on grades and citizenship.

Students go on several class-related field trips, such as to NASA at the Johnson Space Center near Houston, Texas and to the International Thespian Society in Austin, Texas.

Fort Worth Christian also offers students the opportunity to join service trips in Tanzania, Thailand, Nicaragua, Denver, East Texas and Peru). Fort Worth Christian also participates in an array of academic, literary, and musical state meets (e.g., TAPPS, TCSIT, etc.).

Fort Worth Christian School is a member of the Texas Association of Private and Parochial Schools. The Fort Worth Christian Cardinals teams compete in baseball, basketball, cheerleading, cross country, football, golf, soccer, softball, tennis, track, and volleyball. Fort Worth Christian also has an Arts and Theatre department, located in the Campus Center.

State championship titles earned by the school include:
Cross country: 2010 (4A), 2011 (4A)
Football: 1978, 1980, 1992, 2015 (3A)
Girls' basketball: 2002 (4A), 2004 (4A), 2005 (5A), 2006 (5A)
Softball: 2001 (4A), 2011 (4A)
Volleyball: 1979, 1985, 1986 (Division I), 1989 (3A-Girls), 2011 (4A-Girls)

References

External links

Fort Worth Christian School
Facebook
Instagram
Twitter - Main
Twitter - Athletics

Christian schools in Texas
Educational institutions established in 1958
High schools in Tarrant County, Texas
1958 establishments in Texas
Private K-12 schools in Texas
North Richland Hills, Texas